Alla Andreyevna Loboda (born 10 December 1998) is a Russian former competitive ice dancer. With her former skating partner Pavel Drozd, she is a two-time World Junior medalist (silver in 2017, bronze in 2016), a three-time JGP Final silver medalist (2014–15, 2015–16, 2016–17), and the 2016 Russian junior national champion.

Personal life 
Alla Andreyevna Loboda was born on 10 December 1998 in Moscow. She graduated from secondary school in the spring of 2016, planning to enroll at a sports institute. Her elder sister, Lilia, is an economist.

Career

Early years 
Loboda began learning to skate at age four. She trained in single skating at CSKA Moscow, coached by Sofia Kitasheva, before trying out successfully at Ksenia Rumiantseva's ice dancing school around 2009. She competed with Emil Samvelian from 2010 to 2012.

Start of partnership with Drozd 
On 10 March 2012, Loboda began skating with Pavel Drozd, who trained under the same coaches. Led by Ksenia Rumiantseva and Ekaterina Volobueva in Moscow, they placed 11th at the 2013 Russian Junior Championships.

2013–2014 season 
Loboda/Drozd debuted on the ISU Junior Grand Prix (JGP) series in the 2013–14 season, obtaining bronze medals in Riga, Latvia and Gdańsk, Poland. They finished fifth at the 2014 Russian Junior Championships.

2014–2015 season 
Loboda/Drozd's first assignment of the 2014–15 JGP season was in Courchevel, France. Ranked second in the short dance and first in the free dance, they won the gold medal by a margin of 2.82 points over Canada's Madeline Edwards / Zhao Kai Pang. They took silver in Aichi, Japan, finishing second to Edwards/Pang by 0.44 points. Loboda/Drozd qualified for the JGP Final in Barcelona, where they won the silver medal behind teammates Anna Yanovskaya / Sergei Mozgov. Having finished 4th at the 2015 Russian Junior Championships, they were not named in Russia's team to the 2015 World Junior Championships.

2015–2016 season 
In the 2015–16 JGP season, Loboda/Drozd won the silver medal in Bratislava, Slovakia, and then gold in Linz, Austria, before taking silver behind Americans Lorraine McNamara / Quinn Carpenter at the 2015–16 JGP Final in Barcelona. After winning their first junior national title, they were awarded the bronze medal at the 2016 World Junior Championships in Debrecen, Hungary, having finished third behind McNamara/Carpenter and Rachel Parsons / Michael Parsons.

2016–2017 season 
Competing in the 2016–17 JGP season, Loboda/Drozd won gold medals in Saransk, Russia, and Tallinn, Estonia. In December 2016, they were awarded the silver medal behind the Parsons at the 2016–17 JGP Final in Marseille, France.

In March 2017 they won the silver medal at the 2017 World Junior Championships.

2017–2018 season 
Loboda/Drozd started their senior career by winning the silver medal at the 2017 CS Lombardia Trophy. In October 2017 they made their Grand Prix debut at the 2017 Skate Canada where they placed 5th. Next month they competed at their 2nd GP event of the season, the 2017 Internationaux de France, where they placed 9th. In December 2017 they competed at the 2018 Russian Championships where they placed 6th after placing 6th in both the short dance and the free dance.

Anjelika Krylova and Oleg Volkov became their new coaches in May 2018. Loboda and Drozd ended their partnership by July 2018.

2018–2019 season 
Loboda teamed up with Anton Shibnev in summer 2018. Loboda/Shibnev made their international debut at the 2019 Egna Trophy where they won the bronze medal.

Programs 
(with Drozd)

Records and achievements
(with Drozd)

 Set the junior-level ice dance record for the combined total score to 164.37 points at the 2017 World Junior Championships.

Competitive highlights 

GP: Grand Prix; CS: Challenger Series; JGP: Junior Grand Prix

With Shibnev

With Drozd

Detailed results

With Shibnev 

Small medals for short and free programs awarded only at ISU Championships.

With Drozd

References

External links 

 
 

1998 births
Russian female ice dancers
World Junior Figure Skating Championships medalists
Living people
Figure skaters from Moscow